Viktor Kalachik is a Russian professional ice hockey forward who currently plays for Avtomobilist Yekaterinburg of the Kontinental Hockey League (KHL).

References

Living people
Avtomobilist Yekaterinburg players
1981 births
Russian ice hockey forwards